The Dan Patch Rising Star Award is an annual award created in 1986 by members of the United States Harness Writers Association (USHWA). The award recognizes the exceptional early accomplishments of a young harness horse trainer and/or driver. The Association's website states that their members' determination is aided by input from the American Harness Racing Secretaries plus logistic expertise provided by the United States Trotting Association. 

The Dan Patch Rising Star Award is one of several categories in the Dan Patch Award program named for the legendary pacer Dan Patch (1896-1916).

Past winners: 
2022 : Lucas Wallin
2021 : Todd McCarthy
2020 : N/A
2019 : Bob McClure
2018 : Marcus Melander
2017 : Trace Tetrick
2016 : Marcus Miller
2015 :	Montrell Teague
2014 :	Nancy Johansson
2013 :	Corey Callahan
2012 :	Scott Zeron
2011 :	Dan Noble
2010 :	Matt Kakaley
2009 :	Jordan Stratton
2008 :	Jason Bartlett
2007 :	Tim Tetrick
2006 :	Jody Jamieson
2005 :	Mark MacDonald
2004 :	Pat Lachance
2003 :	Yannick Gingras
2002 :	Jeff Gregory
2001 :	Brett Miller

2000 :	Stéphane Bouchard
1999 :	Eric Ledford
1998 :	Robert Stewart
1997 :	Daniel Dubé
1996 :	George Brennan
1995 :	Liz Quesnel
1994 :	Jack Baggit, Jr.
1993 :	David Miller 
1992 :	Luc Ouellette
1991 :	Brian Sears
1990 :	Jerry Riordan
1989 :	Kenneth Seeber
1988 :	Brian Allen
1987 :	Joseph Essig, Jr.
1986 :	Richard Silverman

References

American horse racing awards
Harness racing in the United States